Willi Altig (born 17 January 1935) is a German former professional racing cyclist. He rode in the 1960 and 1966 Tour de France. He is the older brother of cyclist Rudi Altig.

References

External links
 

1935 births
Living people
German male cyclists
Sportspeople from Mannheim
Cyclists from Baden-Württemberg
20th-century German people